Ababkovo is a rural locality (a selo), and the administrative center of Ababkovsky Selsoviet of Pavlovsky District, Russia.

Population
The population was 1181 as of 2010.

Geography 
Ababkovo is located 12 km northeast of Pavlovo (the district's administrative centre) by road. Medvezhye is the nearest rural locality.

Streets 
 Kolkhoznaya
 Molodyozhnaya
 Novaya Liniya
 Polevaya
 Stroiteley
 Tsentralnaya
 Shkolnaya
 Shkolnyy pereulok

References 

Rural localities in Nizhny Novgorod Oblast
Pavlovsky District, Nizhny Novgorod Oblast